The Kaaba, also spelled Ka'ba, Ka'bah or Kabah, sometimes referred to as al-Ka'ba al-Musharrafa, is a religious structure at the center of Islam's most important mosque, the Masjid al-Haram in Mecca, Saudi Arabia. It is the most sacred site in Islam. It is considered by Muslims to be the Bayt Allah and is the qibla (direction of prayer) for Muslims around the world when performing salah. The current structure was built after the original building was damaged by fire during the siege of Mecca by Umayyads in 683.

In early Islam, Muslims faced in the general direction of Jerusalem as the qibla in their prayers before changing the direction to face the Kaaba, believed by Muslims to be a result of a Quranic verse revelation to Muhammad.

According to Islamic history, the Kaaba was rebuilt several times throughout history, most famously by Ibrahim (Abraham) and his son Ismail (Ishmael), when he returned to the valley of Mecca several years after leaving his wife Hajar (Hagar) and Ismail there upon Allah's command. Circling the Kaaba seven times counterclockwise, known as Tawaf, is a Fard (obligatory) rite for the completion of the Hajj and Umrah pilgrimages. The area around the Kaaba where pilgrims walk is called the Mataaf.

The Kaaba and the Mataaf are surrounded by pilgrims every day of the Islamic year, except the 9th of Dhu al-Hijjah, known as the Day of Arafah, on which the cloth covering the structure, known as the Kiswah is changed. However, the most significant increase in their numbers is during Ramadan and the Hajj, when millions of pilgrims gather for Tawaf. According to the Saudi Ministry of Hajj and Umrah, 6,791,100 external pilgrims arrived for the Umrah pilgrimage in the Islamic year .

History

Origin

Etymology

The literal meaning of the word Ka'bah is cube. In the Qur'an, from the era of the life of Muhammad, the Kaaba is mentioned by the following names:
al-Bayt in 2:125 by Allah
Baytī in 22:26 by Allah 
Baytik al-Muḥarram in 14:37 by Ibrahim
al-Bayt al-Ḥarām in 5:97 by Allah
al-Bayt al-ʿAtīq in 22:29 by Allah 

According to historian Eduard Glaser, the name "Kaaba" may have been related to the southern Arabian or Ethiopian word "mikrab", signifying a temple. Author Patricia Crone disputes this etymology.

Background
Historian Patricia Crone has cast doubt on the claim that Mecca was a major historical trading outpost. Other scholars such as Glen Bowersock disagree and assert that it was. Crone later on disregarded some of her theories. She argues that Meccan trade relied on skins, hides, manufactured leather goods, clarified butter, Hijazi woollens, and camels. She suggests that most of these goods were destined for the Roman army, which is known to have required colossal quantities of leather and hides for its equipment.

Prior to Islam, the Kaaba was a holy site for the various Bedouin tribes throughout the Arabian Peninsula. Once every lunar year, Bedouin people would make a pilgrimage to Mecca. Setting aside any tribal feuds, they would worship their gods in the Kaaba and trade with each other in the city. Various sculptures and paintings were held inside the Kaaba. A statue of Hubal (the principal idol of Mecca) and statues of other pagan deities are known to have been placed in or around the Kaaba. Apart from the paintings of pagan idols decorating the walls, which were destroyed at the behest of Muhammad after his conquest of Mecca, there were also paintings of angels, of Ibrahim holding divination arrows, and of Isa (Jesus) and his mother Maryam (Mary), which Muhammad spared. Undefined decorations, money and a pair of ram's horns were recorded to be inside the Kaaba. The pair of ram's horns were said to have belonged to the ram sacrificed by Ibrahim in place of his son Ismail as held by Islamic tradition.

During its history, the Black Stone at the Kaaba has been struck and smashed by a stone fired from a catapult, it has been smeared with excrement, stolen and ransomed by the Qarmatians and smashed into several fragments.

al-Azraqi provides the following narrative on the authority of his grandfather:

In her book Islam: A Short History, Karen Armstrong asserts that the Kaaba was officially dedicated to Hubal, a Nabatean deity, and contained 360 idols which probably represented the days of the year. However, by the time of Muhammad's era, it seems that the Kaaba was venerated as the shrine of Allah, the High God. Once a year, tribes from all around the Arabian Peninsula would converge on Mecca to perform the Hajj pilgrimage, which was a mark of the widespread conviction that Allah was the same deity worshipped by monotheists. At this time, the Muslims would perform the Salat prayer facing Jerusalem, as instructed by Muhammad, and turning their backs on the pagan associations of the Kabah. Alfred Guillaume, in his translation of the Ibn Ishaq's seerah, says that the Kaaba itself might be referred to in the feminine form. Circumambulation was often performed naked by men and almost naked by women. It is disputed whether Allah and Hubal were the same deity or different. According to a hypothesis by Uri Rubin and Christian Robin, Hubal was only venerated by Quraysh and the Kaaba was first dedicated to Allah, a supreme god of individuals belonging to different tribes, while the pantheon of the gods of Quraysh was installed in the Kaaba after they conquered Mecca a century before Muhammad's time.
 
Imoti contends that there were numerous such Kaaba sanctuaries in Arabia at one time, but this was the only one built of stone. The others also allegedly had counterparts of the Black Stone. There was a "Red Stone", in the Kaaba of the South Arabian city of Ghaiman; and the "White Stone" in the Kaaba of al-Abalat (near modern-day Tabala). Grunebaum in Classical Islam points out that the experience of divinity of that period was often associated with the fetishism of stones, mountains, special rock formations, or "trees of strange growth." Armstrong further says that the Kaaba was thought to be at the center of the world, with the Gate of Heaven directly above it. The Kaaba marked the location where the sacred world intersected with the profane; the embedded Black Stone was a further symbol of this as a meteorite that had fallen from the sky and linked heaven and earth.

According to Sarwar, about 400 years before the birth of Muhammad, a man named 'Amr bin Luhayy, who descended from Qahtan and was the king of Hijaz, placed an idol of Hubal on the roof of the Kaaba. This idol was one of the chief deities of the ruling Quraysh tribe. The idol was made of red agate and shaped like a human, but with the right hand broken off and replaced with a golden hand. When the idol was moved inside the Kaaba, it had seven arrows in front of it, which were used for divination. To maintain peace among the perpetually warring tribes, Mecca was declared a sanctuary where no violence was allowed within  of the Kaaba. This combat-free zone allowed Mecca to thrive not only as a place of pilgrimage, but also as a trading center.

In Samaritan literature, the Samaritan Book of the Secrets of Moses (Asatir) states that Ismail and his eldest son Nebaioth built the Kaaba as well as the city of Mecca." The Asatir book was likely compiled in the 10th century CE, though Moses Gaster suggested in 1927 that it was written no later than the second half of the 3rd century BCE.

According to Islamic opinion 

The Qur'an contains several verses regarding the origin of the Kaaba. It states that the Kaaba was the first House of Worship for mankind, and that it was built by Ibrahim and Ismail on Allah's instructions.

Ibn Kathir, in his famous exegesis (tafsir) of the Quran, mentions two interpretations among the Muslims on the origin of the Kaaba. One is that the shrine was a place of worship for mala'ikah angels before the creation of man. Later, a house of worship was built on the location and was lost during the flood in Nuh (Noah)'s time and was finally rebuilt by Ibrahim and Ismail as mentioned later in the Quran. Ibn Kathir regarded this tradition as weak and preferred instead the narration by Ali ibn Abi Talib that although several other temples might have preceded the Kaaba, it was the first Bayt Allah ("House of God"), dedicated solely to Him, built by His instruction, and sanctified and blessed by Him, as stated in Quran 22:26–29. A hadith in Sahih al-Bukhari states that the Kaaba was the first masjid on Earth, and the second was the Al-Aqsa Mosque in Jerusalem.

While Abraham was building the Kaaba, an angel brought to him the Black Stone which he placed in the eastern corner of the structure. Another stone was the Maqam Ibrahim, the Station of Abraham, where Abraham stood for elevation while building the structure. The Black Stone and the Maqam Ibrahim are believed by Muslims to be the only remnant of the original structure made by Abraham as the remaining structure had to be demolished and rebuilt several times over history for its maintenance. After the construction was complete, God enjoined the descendants of Ismail to perform an annual pilgrimage: the Hajj and the Qurban, sacrifice of cattle. The vicinity of the shrine was also made a sanctuary where bloodshed and war were forbidden.

According to Islamic tradition, over the millennia after Ismail's death, his progeny and the local tribes who settled around the Zamzam well gradually turned to polytheism and idolatry. Several idols were placed within the Kaaba representing deities of different aspects of nature and different tribes. Several rituals were adopted in the pilgrimage including doing naked circumambulation. A king named Tubba' is considered the first one to have a door be built for the Kaaba according to sayings recorded in Al-Azraqi's Akhbar Makka.

Ptolemy and Diodorus Siculus
Writing in the Encyclopedia of Islam, Wensinck identifies Mecca with a place called Macoraba mentioned by Ptolemy. G. E. von Grunebaum states: "Mecca is mentioned by Ptolemy. The name he gives it allows us to identify it as a South Arabian foundation created around a sanctuary." In Meccan Trade and the Rise of Islam, Patricia Crone argues that the identification of Macoraba with Mecca is false and that Macoraba was a town in southern Arabia in what was then known as Arabia Felix. A recent study has revisited the arguments for Macoraba and found them unsatisfactory.

Based on an earlier report by Agatharchides of Cnidus, Diodorus Siculus mentions a temple along the Red Sea coast, "which is very holy and exceedingly revered by all Arabians". Edward Gibbon believed that this was the Kaaba. However, Ian D. Morris argues that Gibbon had misread the source: Diodorus puts the temple too far north for it to have been Mecca.

Khuzistan Chronicle 
This short Nestorian (Christian origin) chronicle written no later than the 660s CE covers the history up to the Arab conquest and also gives an interesting note on Arabian geography. The section covering the geography starts with a speculation about the origin of the Muslim sanctuary in Arabia:  This is an early record from the Rashidun caliphate, of a Christian origin that explicitly mentions the Kaaba, and confirms the idea that not just the Arabs but certain Christians as well, associated the site with Ibrahim in the seventh century. This is the second dateable text mentioning the Kaaba, first being some verses from the Quran.

Rock inscriptions 
Saudi archeologist Mohammed Almaghthawi discovered some rock inscriptions mentioning the Masjid al-Haram and the Kaaba, dating back to the first and second centuries of Islam. One of them reads as follows:  Juan Cole is of the opinion that the inscription is likely from the second century A.H. (c. 718 – 815 CE).

Muhammad's era

 
During Muhammad's lifetime (570–632 CE), the Kaaba was considered a holy site by the local Arabs. Muhammad took part in the reconstruction of the Kaaba after its structure was damaged due to floods around 600 CE. Ibn Ishaq's Sirat Rasūl Allāh, one of the biographies of Muhammad (as reconstructed and translated by Guillaume), describes Muhammad settling a quarrel between the Meccan clans as to which clan should set the Black Stone in its place. According to Ishaq's biography, Muhammad's solution was to have all the clan elders raise the cornerstone on a cloak, after which Muhammad set the stone into its final place with his own hands. Ibn Ishaq says that the timber for the reconstruction of the Kaaba came from a Greek ship that had been wrecked on the Red Sea coast at Shu'aybah and that the work was undertaken by a Coptic carpenter called Baqum. Muhammad's Isra' is said to have taken him from the Kaaba to the Masjid al-Aqsa and heavenwards from there.

Muslims initially considered Jerusalem as their qibla, or prayer direction, and faced toward it while offering prayers; however, pilgrimage to the Kaaba was considered a religious duty though its rites were not yet finalized. During the first half of Muhammad's time as a prophet while he was at Mecca, he and his followers were severely persecuted which eventually led to their migration to Medina in 622 CE. In 624 CE, Muslims believe the direction of the qibla was changed from the Masjid al-Aqsa to the Masjid al-Haram in Mecca, with the revelation of Surah 2, verse 144. In 628 CE, Muhammad led a group of Muslims towards Mecca with the intention of performing the Umrah, but was prevented from doing so by the Quraysh. He secured a peace treaty with them, the Treaty of Hudaybiyyah, which allowed the Muslims to freely perform pilgrimage at the Kaaba from the following year.

At the culmination of his mission, in 630 CE, after the allies of the Quraysh, the Banu Bakr, violated the Treaty of Hudaybiyyah, Muhammad conquered Mecca. His first action was to remove statues and images from the Kaaba. According to reports collected by Ibn Ishaq and al-Azraqi, Muhammad spared a painting of Mary and Jesus, and a fresco of Ibrahim.

Al-Azraqi further conveys how Muhammad, after he entered the Kaaba on the day of the conquest, ordered all the pictures erased except that of Maryam:

After the conquest, Muhammad restated the sanctity and holiness of Mecca, including its Great Mosque (Masjid al-Haram), in Islam. He performed the Hajj in 632 CE called the Hujjat ul-Wada' ("Farewell Pilgrimage") since Muhammad prophesied his impending death on this event.

After Muhammad

The Kaaba has been repaired and reconstructed many times. The structure was severely damaged by a fire on 3 Rabi' I 64 AH or Sunday, 31 October 683 CE, during the first siege of Mecca in the war between the Umayyads and 'Abdullah ibn al-Zubayr, an early Muslim who ruled Mecca for many years between the death of ʿAli and the consolidation of power by the Umayyads. 'Abdullah rebuilt it to include the hatīm. He did so on the basis of a tradition (found in several hadith collections) that the hatīm was a remnant of the foundations of the Abrahamic Kaaba, and that Muhammad himself had wished to rebuild it so as to include it.

The Kaaba was bombarded with stones in the second siege of Mecca in 692, in which the Umayyad army was led by al-Hajjaj ibn Yusuf. The fall of the city and the death of 'Abdullah ibn al-Zubayr allowed the Umayyads under 'Abd al-Malik ibn Marwan to finally reunite all the Islamic possessions and end the long civil war. In 693 CE, 'Abd al-Malik had the remnants of al-Zubayr's Kaaba razed, and rebuilt it on the foundations set by the Quraysh. The Kaaba returned to the cube shape it had taken during Muhammad's time.

During the Hajj of 930 CE, the Shi'ite Qarmatians attacked Mecca under Abu Tahir al-Jannabi, defiled the Zamzam Well with the bodies of pilgrims and stole the Black Stone, taking it to the oasis in Eastern Arabia known as al-Aḥsāʾ, where it remained until the Abbasids ransomed it in 952 CE. The basic shape and structure of the Kaaba have not changed since then.

After heavy rains and flooding in 1626, the walls of the Kaaba collapsed and the Mosque was damaged. The same year, during the reign of Ottoman Emperor Murad IV, the Kaaba was rebuilt with granite stones from Mecca, and the Mosque was renovated.

The Kaaba is depicted on the reverse of 500 Saudi riyal, and the 2000 Iranian rial banknotes.

Architecture and interior
The Kaaba is a cuboid-shaped structure made of stones. Inside the Kaaba, the floor is made of marble and limestone.

The wall directly adjacent to the entrance of the Kaaba has six tablets inlaid with inscriptions, and there are several more tablets along the other walls. Along the top corners of the walls runs a black cloth embroidered with gold Qur'anic verses. Caretakers anoint the marble cladding with the same scented oil used to anoint the Black Stone outside. Three pillars (some erroneously report two) stand inside the Kaaba, with a small altar or table set between one and the other two. Lamp-like objects (possible lanterns or crucible censers) hang from the ceiling. The ceiling itself is of a darker colour, similar in hue to the lower trimming. The Bāb ut-Tawbah—on the right wall (right of the entrance) opens to an enclosed staircase that leads to a hatch, which itself opens to the roof. Both the roof and ceiling (collectively dual-layered) are made of stainless steel-capped teak wood.

Each numbered item in the following list corresponds to features noted in the diagram image.
 The Ḥajar al-Aswad, is located on the Kaaba's eastern corner. It is the location where Muslims start their circumambulation of the Kaaba, known as the tawaf.
In 1979, the  gold doors made by artist Ahmad bin Ibrahim Badr, replaced the old silver doors made by his father, Ibrahim Badr, in 1942. There is a wooden staircase on wheels, usually stored in the mosque between the arch-shaped gate of Banū Shaybah and the Zamzam Well. The oldest surviving door dates back to 1045 AH (1635–6 CE).
 The Mīzāb ar-Raḥmah, commonly shortened to Mīzāb or Meezab is a rain spout made of gold. Added when the Kaaba was rebuilt in 1627, after a flood in 1626 caused three of the four walls to collapse.
 This slant structure, covering three sides of the Kaaba, is known as the Shadherwaan and was added in 1627 along with the Mīzāb ar-Raḥmah to protect the foundation from rainwater.
 The Hatīm (also romanized as hateem) and also known as the Hijr Ismail, is a low wall that was part of the original Kaaba. It is a semi-circular wall opposite, but not connected to, the north-west wall of the Kaaba. The space between the hatīm and the Kaaba was originally part of the Kaaba, and is thus not entered during the tawaf.
 al-Multazam, the roughly  space along the wall between the Black Stone and the entry door. It is sometimes considered pious or desirable for a pilgrim to touch this area of the Kaaba, or perform dua here.
 The Station of Ibrahim (Maqam Ibrahim) is a glass and metal enclosure with what is said to be an imprint of Ibrahim's feet. Ibrahim is said to have stood on this stone during the construction of the upper parts of the Kaaba, raising Ismail on his shoulders for the uppermost parts.
 The corner of the Black Stone. It faces very slightly southeast from the center of the Kaaba. The four corners of the Kaaba roughly point toward the four cardinal directions of the compass.
 The Rukn al-Yamani, also known as Rukn-e-Yamani or Rukn-e-Yemeni, is the corner of the Kaaba facing slightly southwest from the center of the Kaaba.
 The Rukn ush-Shami, also known as Rukn-e-Shami, is the corner of the Kaaba facing very slightly northwest from the center of the Kaaba.
 The Rukn al-'Iraqi, is the corner that faces slightly northeast from the center of the Kaaba.
 Kiswah, the embroidered covering. Kiswa is a black silk and gold curtain which is replaced annually during the Hajj pilgrimage. Two-thirds of the way up is the hizam, a band of gold-embroidered Quranic text, including the Shahada, the Islamic declaration of faith. The curtain over the door of the Kaaba is especially ornate and is known as the sitara or burqu'. The hizam and sitara have inscriptions embroidered in gold and silver wire, including verses from the Quran and supplications to Allah.
 Marble stripe marking the beginning and end of each circumambulation.
Note: The major (long) axis of the Kaaba has been observed to align with the rising of the star Canopus toward which its southern wall is directed, while its minor axis (its east–west facades) roughly align with the sunrise of summer solstice and the sunset of winter solstice.

Significance in Islam
The Kaaba is the holiest site in Islam, and is often called by names such as the Bayt Allah. and Bayt Allah al-Haram.

Tawaf 

Ṭawāf is one of the Islamic rituals of pilgrimage and is compulsory during both the Hajj and Umrah. Pilgrims go around the Kaaba (the most sacred site in Islam) seven times in a counterclockwise direction; the first three at a hurried pace on the outer part of the Mataaf and the latter four times closer to the Kaaba at a leisurely pace. The circling is believed to demonstrate the unity of the believers in the worship of the One God, as they move in harmony together around the Kaaba, while supplicating to God. To be in a state of Wudu (ablution) is mandatory while performing tawaf as it is considered to be a form of worship ('ibadah).

Tawaf begins from the corner of the Kaaba with the Black Stone. If possible, Muslims are to kiss or touch it, but this is often not possible because of the large crowds. They are also to chant the Basmala and Takbir each time they complete one revolution. Hajj pilgrims are generally advised to "make ṭawāf" at least twice – once as part of the Hajj, and again before leaving Mecca.

The five types of ṭawāf are:
Ṭawāf al-Qudūm (arrival ṭawāf) is performed by those not residing in Mecca once reaching the Holy City.
Ṭawāf aṭ-Ṭaḥīyah (greeting ṭawāf) is performed after entering al-Masjid al-Haram at any other times and is mustahab.
Ṭawāf al-'Umrah (Umrah ṭawāf) refers to the ṭawāf performed specifically for Umrah.
Ṭawāf al-Wadā''' ("farewell ṭawāf") is performed before leaving Mecca.Ṭawāf az-Zīyārah (ṭawāf of visiting), Ṭawāf al-'Ifāḍah (ṭawāf of compensation) or Ṭawāf al-Ḥajj (Hajj ṭawāf) is performed after completing the Hajj.

The Tawaf has its origins in the religion of the Najranite pagans, who walked around the Kaaba in an act of devotion to their creator god, Allah (not to be confused with the monotheistic god of Islam by the same name). This practice was adopted by Mohammad after some reform.

As the Qibla

The Qibla is the direction faced during prayer. The direction faced during prayer is the direction of the Kaaba, relative to the person praying. Apart from praying, Muslims generally consider facing the Qibla while reciting the Quran to be a part of good etiquette.

Cleaning
The building is opened biannually for the ceremony of "The Cleaning of the Sacred Kaaba". The ceremony takes place on the 1st of Sha'baan, the eighth month of the Islamic calendar, around thirty days before the start of the month of Ramadan and on the 15th of Muharram, the first month. The keys to the Kaaba are held by the Banī Shaybah tribe, an honor bestowed upon them by Muhammad. Members of the tribe greet visitors to the inside of the Kaaba on the occasion of the cleaning ceremony.

The Governor of the Makkah Province and accompanying dignitaries clean the interior of the Kaaba using cloths dipped in Zamzam water scented with Oud perfume. Preparations for the washing start a day before the agreed date, with the mixing of Zamzam water with several luxurious perfumes including Tayef rose, 'oud and musk. Zamzam water mixed with rose perfume is splashed on the floor and is wiped with palm leaves. Usually, the entire process is completed in two hours.

See also

Al-Masjid an-NabawiBayt al-Mawlid, the house where Muhammad is believed to have been born
List of largest mosques
List of mosques in Saudi Arabia

Notes

References

Bibliography
Armstrong, Karen (2000, 2002). Islam: A Short History. .
Crone, Patricia (2004). Meccan Trade and the Rise of Islam. Piscataway, New Jersey: Gorgias.
Elliott, Jeri (1992). Your Door to Arabia. .
Guillaume, A. (1955). The Life of Muhammad. Oxford: Oxford University Press.

Hawting, G.R; Kaʿba. Encyclopaedia of the QurʾānHisham Ibn Al-Kalbi The book of Idols, translated with introduction and notes by Nabih Amin Faris 1952
Macaulay-Lewis, Elizabeth, The Kaba (text), Smarthistory.
Mohamed, Mamdouh N. (1996). Hajj to Umrah: From A to Z. Amana Publications. .
Peterson, Andrew (1997). Dictionary of Islamic Architecture London: Routledge.
Wensinck, A. J; Kaʿba. Encyclopaedia of Islam IV[1915] The Book of History, a History of All Nations From the Earliest Times to the Present'', Viscount Bryce (Introduction), The Grolier Society.

External links

Ka'bah info: Everything you want to know about the Holy Ka'bah
SA's Official Live Webcam of the Kaaba
Former door of the Kaaba (ca. 1635)

 
Articles containing video clips
Religious buildings and structures converted into mosques